Roger Henry Brough Whittaker (born 22 March 1936) is a British singer-songwriter and musician, who was born in Nairobi to English parents. His music is an eclectic mix of folk music and popular songs in addition to radio airplay hits. He is best known for his baritone singing voice and trademark whistling ability as well as his guitar skills.

He is widely known for his version of "Wind Beneath My Wings" (1982), as well as his own compositions "Durham Town (The Leavin')" (1969) and "I Don't Believe in If Anymore" (1970). American audiences are most familiar with his 1970 hit "New World in the Morning" and his 1975 hit "The Last Farewell", which is his only single to hit the Billboard Hot 100 (it made the Top 20) and also hit No. 1 on the Adult Contemporary chart. He is also known for his renditions of "Ding! Dong! Merrily on High" and "The Twelve Days of Christmas". His final top-charting hit was "Albany", which reached No. 3 in West Germany in 1982.

Childhood and beginning
Whittaker's parents, Edward and Vi Whittaker, were from Staffordshire, England, where they owned and operated a grocery shop. His father was injured in a motorcycle accident and the family moved to a farm near Thika, Kenya, because of its warmer climate. His grandfather sang in various clubs and his father played the violin. Roger learned to play the guitar.

Upon completing his primary education, Whittaker was admitted to Prince of Wales School (now Nairobi School). Upon completing his high school education, he was called up for national service and spent two years in the Kenya Regiment fighting the Mau Mau in the Aberdare Forest. In 1956 he was demobilised and decided on a career in medicine. He enrolled at the University of Cape Town in South Africa. However, he left after 18 months and joined the civil service education department as a teacher, following in his mother's footsteps.

Recording and performing career
To further his teaching career, Whittaker moved to Britain in September 1959. For the next three years, he studied zoology, biochemistry and marine biology at University College of North Wales and earned a Bachelor of Science degree while singing in local clubs, and released songs on Flexi discs included with the campus newspaper, the Bangor University Rag.

Shortly afterwards, he was signed to Fontana Records, which released his first professional single, "The Charge of the Light Brigade", in 1962. (On the labels of the Fontana singles, he is billed as "Rog Whittaker".) In the summer of 1962, Whittaker performed in Portrush, Northern Ireland. He achieved a breakthrough when he was signed to appear on an Ulster Television show called This and That. His second single was a cover version of "Steel Men", released in June 1962.

In 1966, Whittaker switched from Fontana to EMI's Columbia label, and was billed as Roger Whittaker from this point forward. His fourth single for the imprint was "Durham Town (The Leavin')", which in 1969 became Whittaker's first UK Top 20 hit in the UK Singles Chart. Whittaker's US label, RCA Victor, released the uptempo "New World in the Morning" in 1970, where it became a Top 20 hit in Billboard magazine's Easy Listening chart. That same year, his downbeat theme song "No Blade of Grass", written for the film adaptation of the same name that was sung during both the opening and ending titles, became his first film credit.

In the early 1970s, Whittaker took interest in the Nordic countries when he recorded the single "Where the Angels Tread" (Änglamarken) to the music of Evert Taube in 1972. In 1974 he performed at the Finnish Eurovision qualifications. The song "The Finnish Whistler" he performed became famous in Finland as it was used as a title music for the popular Finnish Yle television cooking programme Patakakkonen.

In 1975, EMI released "The Last Farewell", a track from his 1971 New World in the Morning album. It became his biggest hit and a signature song, selling more than 11 million copies worldwide. In 1979, Whittaker wrote the song "Call My Name" which reached the final of the UK Eurovision selection, A Song For Europe, performed by Eleanor Keenan and came third. Whittaker recorded the song himself and the single charted in several European countries. He established himself in country music with "I Love You Because" getting "into the lower reaches of the country chart" in late 1983.

Throughout the 1970s and 1980s, Whittaker had success in Germany, with German language songs produced by Nick Munro. Unable to speak German, Whittaker sang the songs phonetically. He appeared on German and Danish TV several times, and was on the UK Top of the Pops show ten times in the 1970s. Whittaker's German-language songs were not initially well received by the critics, who derided the songs as "meaningless folk music". Notwithstanding, Whittaker released 25 albums in Germany and managed to grow a considerable fan base within the country, where he feels he has his most loyal fans, saying "The past few decades have been wonderful … My relationship with the German fans is great."

In March 2006, Whittaker announced on his website that a 2007 Germany tour would be his last, and that he would limit future performances to "occasional concerts". Now more fluent in German, he was seen singing and was interviewed in German on Danish TV in November 2008. In a 2014 interview, Whittaker reiterated that he had retired from touring in 2013, but claimed that he had written 18 new songs for an album and said "I still whistle very well".

Personal life
Before moving on to a career in music, Whittaker studied medicine and trained as a teacher in his native Kenya. He also completed his National Service in the Kenya Regiment. He said that he was "stupid, selfish and angry" in his youth and that the army "made a man" out of him.

On 1 April 1989, Whittaker's parents (still living in Kenya) were subjected to a brutal attack by a gang of four men in which his mother was tortured for eight hours and his father was murdered. His mother moved back to England after the incident. Roger Whittaker said about the incident, "It will affect me for the rest of my life, but I believe we should all live without hate if we can".

In 1964, Roger met Natalie O'Brien, and they married in August. She has been Whittaker's manager since 1989. They have five children: two sons and three daughters (Emily, Lauren, Jessica, Guy and Alexander). Jessica became a presenter on VH-1. They now have 11 grandchildren. In 1986, he published his autobiography, So Far, So Good, co-written with his wife.

Tours
In 1976, Whittaker undertook his first tour of the United States. In 2003, he again toured Germany. After recovering from heart problems at the end of 2004, he started touring in Germany in 2005, and then in the UK from May to July.

Awards
In his career to date, Whittaker has earned over 250 silver, gold and platinum awards. He was part of a successful British team that won the annual Knokke Music Festival in Belgium, and won the Press Prize as the personality of the festival. He was awarded a 'Gold Badge Award', from the British Academy of Songwriters, Composers and Authors (BASCA) in 1988 and earned a "Golden Tuning Fork" (Goldene Stimmgabel in Germany) in 1986, based on record sales and TV viewer votes.

He was the subject of This Is Your Life in 1982 when he was surprised by Eamonn Andrews at RAF Northolt.

Discography

 New World in the Morning (1971)
 The Magical World of Roger Whittaker (1975)
 The Roger Whittaker Christmas Album (1978)
 A musical safari- My land is Kenya Album (1984)

References

External links

 

1936 births
Living people
Alumni of Nairobi School
English folk musicians
French-language singers
German-language singers
Kenyan musicians
Kenyan people of English descent
Kenya Regiment officers
Musicians from Nairobi
Schlager musicians
Alumni of Bangor University
University of Cape Town alumni
Whistlers
Ivor Novello Award winners
Kenyan emigrants to the United Kingdom
English folk guitarists
English male guitarists
White Kenyan people
20th-century Kenyan male singers